The Gleneagles Hotel was a hotel in Torquay, Devon, England. The 41-bed establishment, which opened in the 1960s, was the inspiration for Fawlty Towers, a British situation comedy first broadcast in the mid-1970s. John Cleese, and his then wife Connie Booth, were inspired to write the series after they had stayed at the hotel and witnessed the eccentric behaviour of its owner, Donald Sinclair (who sold the hotel in 1973). Later the hotel was managed by Best Western. In February 2015 the hotel closed. It has since been replaced by retirement apartments.

History 
The Gleneagles was not originally built as a hotel but was modified to become one. The hotel was first opened in 1963 and was managed by Donald Sinclair. It was initially described as "upmarket" because it advertised private bathrooms in every room. In the early 1970s, cast members of Monty Python's Flying Circus stayed at the Gleneagles for a planned three weeks, while filming in Paignton. Due to Sinclair's rudeness towards them, which included criticising Terry Gilliam's "too American" table etiquette and tossing Eric Idle's briefcase out of a window "in case it contained a bomb", the cast left the hotel apart from John Cleese and his wife, Connie Booth. Cleese described Sinclair as "the most marvellously rude man I've ever met" and based his Basil Fawlty character on him when he and Booth created Fawlty Towers five years later. Sinclair sold the Gleneagles in 1973. For the rest of its existence, the hotel retained a reminder of Sinclair's legacy: the 41 rooms all had names such as Coral or Mimosa. This was introduced in the Sinclair era of Gleneagles.

In August 2003, developers submitted plans to demolish the hotel and build a block of flats on the site, claiming the building was "unattractive with little architectural merit". In October, Torbay Town Council rejected the application, claiming that it would be against its rules of tourism. In September 2006, Prunella Scales, who played Sybil Fawlty, was "guest of honour" at the reopening of the hotel after a £1 million makeover. The hotel was a part of the Best Western hotel chain.

After the hotel was closed permanently in February 2015, permission was given in November 2015 to demolish the hotel and replace it with retirement apartments, to be built by Churchill Retirement Living.
The development was named Sachs Lodge in memory of Andrew Sachs who played Manuel in the sitcom and who died in 2016.

In popular culture 
The Gleneagles Hotel is mentioned in "The Builders" episode of Fawlty Towers as a suggestion for alternative dinner arrangements for the guests while Fawlty Towers was undergoing renovations.

References

External links

Official site (archived link)

Hotels established in 1963
Hotels in Devon
Fawlty Towers
Buildings and structures in Torquay